Gummiglobus is a genus of truffle-like fungi in the Mesophelliaceae family. The genus contains Australian two species described as new to science in 1996. The species, G. agglutinosporus and G. joyceae, "have columellae with wedge-shaped to digitate or strand-like projections that extend to the endocutis of the peridium and are embedded in a remarkable gummy tissue".

References

External links
 

Hysterangiales
Truffles (fungi)
Agaricomycetes genera
Taxa named by James Trappe